Events in the year 2021 in Burundi.

Incumbents
President: Évariste Ndayishimiye 
Prime Minister: Alain-Guillaume Bunyoni

Events
Ongoing — COVID-19 pandemic in Burundi

4 February – Burundi Airlines is established.

Deaths
19 February – Clotilde Niragira, politician and lawyer, Minister of Justice (born 1968).
6 March – Nicolas Bwakira, 79, diplomat. (death announced on this date)

References

 
2020s in Burundi
Years of the 21st century in Burundi
Burundi
Burundi